Muff or MUFF may refer to:

Clothing
 Muff (handwarmer), a fashion accessory, usually of fur, for keeping the hands warm
 Earmuffs, a device for protecting the ears

Places
 Muff, former name of Eglinton, County Londonderry 
 Muff, County Donegal, Ireland
 Muff, Pennsylvania, an unincorporated community in the United States

People
 André Muff (born 1981), Swiss footballer
 George Muff, 1st Baron Calverley (1877–1955), British politician
 Thomas Harold Broadbent Maufe (1898–1942), British Army officer awarded the Victoria Cross (last name changed from Muff in 1909)
 Werner Muff (born 1974), Swiss equestrian
 Wolfgang Muff (1880–1947), German World War II general
 Muff Winwood (born 1943), English songwriter and record producer

Other uses
 The Muff, a 1919 German silent film
 Melbourne Underground Film Festival
 Muff Potter, a character in The Adventures of Tom Sawyer and associated works
 Hans Muff, one of the companions of Saint Nicholas
 Muffed punt, in gridiron football, the act of touching a punted ball before possessing it
 Muff (chicken), a mutation found in chickens, which causes extra feathering under the chicken's face
 Muff, a method of making stained glass
 Slang term for the human female vulva
 Muffing, a sex act involving the inguinal canals

See also
 Muf (disambiguation)
 The Muffs, an American punk rock band
 The Muffs (album), the band's 1993 debut album
 Yochanan Muffs (1932–2009), American-Jewish professor of the Bible and religion

German-language surnames
Swiss-German surnames

pl:Mufka